Kalateh-ye Mazinan (also Romanized as Kalāteh-ye Mazīnān and Kalāteh Mazīnān and Kalāteh) is a village in Mazinan Rural District, Central District, Davarzan County, Razavi Khorasan Province, Iran. At the 2006 census, its population was 503, in 154 families.

References 

Populated places in Davarzan County